The Raleigh and Gaston Railroad was a Raleigh, North Carolina, based railroad opened in April 1840 between Raleigh and the town of Gaston, North Carolina, on the Roanoke River. It was North Carolina's second railroad (the Wilmington and Weldon Railroad opened one month earlier). Part of the Raleigh and Gaston's tracks remains in service today as part of CSX's S Line as the Norlina Subdivision of CSX's Florence Division.

History

Construction on the line began in 1836.  At the north end, the line initially crossed the Roanoke River near Roanoke Rapids on a 1,040-foot long bridge to connect the line to Gaston.  In Gaston, it connected with the Greensville and Roanoke Railroad (which was operated by the Petersburg Railroad).  In 1852, the line was extended from Roanoke Rapids east to Weldon.

The Raleigh and Gaston Railroad served the Confederacy during the American Civil War.  Its track provided a link in a route that provided the most direct route from Richmond, Virginia and Raleigh at the time.  During the fall of Richmond, the original bridge over the Roanoke River at Gaston was destroyed and was never rebuilt.  After the war, the line was reconnected to the north side of the river when the Seaboard and Roanoke Railroad rebuilt their bridge over the Roanoke River at Weldon.

The railroad built the Franklinton Depot in 1886. It was listed on the National Register of Historic Places in 1990.

The Raleigh and Gaston Railroad merged with the Seaboard Air Line Railroad (SAL) in 1900.  At the same time, SAL finished a line running from Norlina north to Richmond, Virginia (which was chartered by the Richmond, Petersburg and Carolina Railroad).  This line, along with the former Raleigh and Gaston Railroad from Norlina south became the SAL's main line.  The line from Norlina to Weldon became part of SAL's Portsmouth Subdivision.

In 1967, the SAL merged with its rival, the Atlantic Coast Line Railroad (ACL).  The merged company was named the Seaboard Coast Line Railroad (SCL).  After the merger, the ex-SAL main line became known as the S Line in the combined network.  Track from Norlina to Weldon was then known as the Roanoke Rapid Subdivision, which has since been abandoned. 

In 1980, the Seaboard Coast Line's parent company merged with the Chessie System, creating the CSX Corporation.  The CSX Corporation initially operated the Chessie and Seaboard Systems separately until 1986, when they were merged into CSX Transportation.  CSX abandoned the S Line (the designation for the former Seaboard Air Line main line) north of Norlina into Virginia in 1985.

Current Conditions
Today, much of the Raleigh and Gaston Railroad remains in service.  Track from Raleigh to Norlina is now CSX's Norlina Subdivision.  Track from Norlina to Roanoke Rapids was abandoned in 1983, but the short segment from Weldon to Roanoke Rapids is still in service as CSX's Roanoke Rapids Spur (which connects to CSX's A Line).

Station listing

Notes

See also

Raleigh and Gaston / Seaboard Coast Line Building
List of defunct North Carolina railroads

References

External links 
 North Carolina Office of Archives and History: Marker E-22: Raleigh and Gaston Railroad
 CSA-railroads.com: Raleigh & Gaston Railroad
 DocSouth: Proceedings of the Sixth Annual Meeting of the Stockholders of the Raleigh & Gaston Railroad Company
 NY Times: Raleigh and Gaston shareholders approve Seaboard consolidation
 NPS: Early History -- Raleigh: A Capital City
 NC Go - History of Transportation - 1800-1850

4 ft 8 in gauge railways in the United States
Defunct North Carolina railroads
Predecessors of the Seaboard Air Line Railroad
Railway companies established in 1835
Railway companies disestablished in 1901
Defunct Georgia (U.S. state) railroads
Defunct South Carolina railroads
American companies established in 1835
American companies disestablished in 1901